Trigonopterus argopurensis is a species of flightless weevil in the genus Trigonopterus from Indonesia.

Etymology
The species is named after the type locality of Mount Argopuro.

Description
The holotype measured 3.28mm long.  General coloration is black.  The legs, head, and elytra are rust colored, with an indistinct black stripe running transversely across the elytra.

Range
Its range is limited on the upper slope by unsuitable forests, and on the lower slopes by coffee gardens.

Phylogeny
T. argopurensis is part of the T. dimorphus species group.

References

argopurensis
Beetles described in 2014
Beetles of Asia